Premnobius is a genus of typical bark beetles in the family Curculionidae. There are more than 30 described species in Premnobius.

Species
These 32 species belong to the genus Premnobius:

 Premnobius adjunctus Bright & Skidmore, 1997
 Premnobius ambitiosus Wood & Bright, 1992
 Premnobius amphicranoides Schedl
 Premnobius binodosus Nunberg, 1969a
 Premnobius bituberculatus Eggers, 1932c
 Premnobius brasiliensis Nunberg, 1958a
 Premnobius cavipennis Eichhoff, 1878
 Premnobius circumcinctus Schedl, 1941d
 Premnobius circumspinatus Eggers, 1924
 Premnobius corruptus Wood & Bright, 1992
 Premnobius corthyloides Hagedorn, 1910b
 Premnobius declivis Eggers, 1944b
 Premnobius familiaris Wood & Bright, 1992
 Premnobius felix Wood & Bright, 1992
 Premnobius hystrix Wood & Bright, 1992
 Premnobius ivoriensis Nunberg, 1969a
 Premnobius latior Eggers, 1933b
 Premnobius longus Eggers, 1932c
 Premnobius marginatus Eggers, 1932c
 Premnobius minor Eggers, 1927a
 Premnobius mukunyae Wood & Bright, 1992
 Premnobius nodulosus Hagedorn, 1908
 Premnobius orientalis Eggers, 1932c
 Premnobius perspinidens Browne, 1961d
 Premnobius pseudohystrix Wood & Bright, 1992
 Premnobius quadridens Eggers, 1927a
 Premnobius quadrispinosus Schedl, 1938h
 Premnobius robustulus Wood & Bright, 1992
 Premnobius sexnotatus Wood & Bright, 1992
 Premnobius sexspinosus Eggers, 1924
 Premnobius spinifer Eggers, 1927a
 Premnobius spinosus Hagedorn, 1908

References

Further reading

 
 
 

Scolytinae
Articles created by Qbugbot